Dennis Roscoe Hardman (born 9 April 1943) is a Zimbabwean former sports shooter. He competed at the 1980 Summer Olympics and the 1984 Summer Olympics.

References

External links
 

1943 births
Living people
Zimbabwean male sport shooters
Olympic shooters of Zimbabwe
Shooters at the 1980 Summer Olympics
Shooters at the 1984 Summer Olympics
Place of birth missing (living people)